This list of works by Philip Johnson categorizes the Pritzker Prize-winning architect's work. Johnson was a postmodern architect active in the 20th century. Many of his works were produced in collaboration with John Burgee, and many of his most famous buildings were offices.

1943–1980

 Johnson House at Cambridge, "The Ash Street House", Cambridge, Massachusetts (1941)
 Booth (Damora) House, Bedford Village, New York (1946)
 Johnson House, "The Glass House", New Canaan, Connecticut (1949)
 Benjamin V. Wolf House, “The Wolfhouse” Newburgh, New York (1949)
 John de Menil House, Houston, Texas (1950)
 Rockefeller Guest House for Blanchette Ferry Rockefeller, New York City (1950)
 Abby Aldrich Rockefeller Sculpture Garden at The Museum of Modern Art, New York City, New York (1953)
 Seagram Building, New York City, New York (in collaboration with Mies van der Rohe; 1956)
 Reactor Building, Soreq, Israel (1956-1959)
 The Four Seasons Restaurant, New York City, New York (1959)
 Academic Mall at the University of Saint Thomas, Houston, Texas (1959)
 Expansion of St. Anselm's Abbey, Washington, D.C. (1960)
 Museum of Art at Munson-Williams-Proctor Arts Institute, Utica, New York (1960); it was listed on the National Register of Historic Places in 2010.
 Amon Carter Museum of American Art, Fort Worth, Texas (1961; also expansion in 2001)
 Brown University Computing Laboratory, Providence, Rhode Island (1961)
 Sheldon Museum of Art, Lincoln, Nebraska (1963)
 New York State Theater (renamed David H. Koch Theater) at Lincoln Center, New York City, New York (with Richard Foster; 1964)
 New York State Pavilion for the 1964 New York World's Fair, New York City, New York (with Foster; 1964)
 The Beck House (childhood home of Henry C. Beck III ), Dallas, TX (1965)
 Laboratory of Epidemiology and Public Health at Yale University, New Haven, CT (1966)
 Kreeger Museum, Washington, D.C. (with Foster; 1967)
 Elmer Holmes Bobst Library at New York University, New York City, New York (with Foster; 1967–1973)
 Kunsthalle Bielefeld, Bielefeld, Germany (1968)
 WRVA Building, Richmond, Virginia (1968)
 Neuberger Museum of Art at the State University of New York at Purchase, Purchase, New York (1969)
 John Fitzgerald Kennedy Memorial, Dallas, Texas (1970)
 Albert and Vera List Art Building, Brown University, Providence, Rhode Island (1971)
 IDS Center, Minneapolis, Minnesota (1972)
 Art Museum of South Texas, Corpus Christi, Texas (1972)
 Johnson Building at the Boston Public Library, Boston, Massachusetts (1973)
 Fort Worth Water Gardens, Fort Worth, Texas (1974)
 Pennzoil Place, Houston, Texas (1975)
 Dorothy and Dexter Baker Center for the Arts at Muhlenberg College, Allentown, Pennsylvania (1976)
 Thanks-Giving Square, Dallas, Texas (1976)
 Banaven Center, Caracas, Venezuela (1976)
 Century Center (South Bend), South Bend, Indiana (Johnson/Burgee Architects; 1977)
 101 California Street, San Francisco, California (Johnson/Burgee Architects; 1979–1982)
 Crystal Cathedral, Garden Grove, California (1980)

1981–2010

 National Centre for the Performing Arts complex in Mumbai, India (including the Tata Theatre, Jamshed Bhabha Theatre, and Experimental Theatre (NCPA) (1981-1985)
 Neiman Marcus Department Store, San Francisco, California (1982)
 Metro-Dade Cultural Center, Miami, Florida (1982)
 TC Energy Center (formerly Bank of America Center), Houston, Texas (1983)
 Transco Tower (renamed Williams Tower), Houston, Texas (1983)
 Cleveland Play House, Cleveland, Ohio (extension; 1983)
 Wells Fargo Center, Denver, Colorado (1983)
 PPG Place, Pittsburgh, Pennsylvania (1984)
 The Gerald D. Hines College of Architecture, University of Houston, Houston, Texas (1985)
 580 California Street, San Francisco, California (1985)
 Lipstick Building, New York City, New York (1986)
 The Crescent (Dallas), Dallas, Texas (1986)
 Tycon Center, Fairfax County, Virginia (1986)
 Comerica Bank Tower, Dallas, Texas (1987)
 190 South LaSalle Street, Chicago, Illinois (John Burgee Architects, Philip Johnson Consultant; 1987)
 One Atlantic Center, Atlanta, Georgia (1987)
 Gate of Europe, Madrid, Spain (John Burgee Architects, Philip Johnson Consultant; 1989–1996)
 191 Peachtree Tower, Atlanta, Georgia (John Burgee Architects, Philip Johnson Consultant; 1990)
 Paley Center for Media (formerly The Museum of Television & Radio), New York City, New York (1991)
 Chapel of St. Basil on the Academic Mall at the University of St. Thomas, Houston, Texas (with John Manley, Architect; 1992)
 Millenia Walk and The Conrad Centennial Hotel (part of the Millenia Walk Development), Marina Bay, Singapore (with Kevin Roche, and John Burgee 1992)
 The Department of Mathematics at Ohio State University, Columbus, Ohio (1992)
 Science and Engineering Library at Ohio State University, Columbus, Ohio (1992)
 Canadian Broadcasting Centre, Toronto, Canada (Bregman + Hamann Architects, Scott Associates Architects, Barton Myers Associates, John Burgee Architects, Philip Johnson Consultant; 1992)
 AEGON Center, Louisville, Kentucky (John Burgee Architects, Philip Johnson Consultant; 1993)
 One Detroit Center, Detroit, Michigan (John Burgee Architects, Philip Johnson Consultant; 1993)
 Visitor's Pavilion, New Canaan, Connecticut (1994)
 Turning Point at Case Western Reserve University, Cleveland, Ohio (1996)
 Philip-Johnson-Haus, Berlin, Germany (1997)
 First Union Plaza, Boca Raton, Florida (2000)
 Urban Glass House, 330 Spring Street, SoHo, Manhattan, New York City (2005); Interior by Annabelle Selldorf. Completed posthumously in 2006.
 Interfaith Peace Chapel on the Cathedral of Hope campus, Dallas, Texas (2010)

References

Johnson, Philip